15 Sagittarii is a blue-hued binary star system in the southern zodiac constellation of Sagittarius. It is faintly visible to the naked eye with an apparent visual magnitude of 5.37. The system is moving closer to the Sun with a heliocentric radial velocity of around −6 km/s.

Chini et al. (2012) identify this as a double-lined spectroscopic binary star system. It shows a stellar classification of O9.7 Iab, matching a massive O-type supergiant star. Along with the O-type star 16 Sgr (HD 167263), it is ionizing an H II region along the western edge of the molecular cloud L291.

The Washington Double Star Catalog lists four companions within a 2 arcsecond angular radius.

References

O-type supergiants
Spectroscopic binaries
Sagittarius (constellation)
Durchmusterung objects
Sagittarii, 15
167264
089439
6822